Ballaciner is an essay by French Nobel laureate J. M. G. Le Clézio with help from Gilles Jacob. It was originally published in French in 2003.

Ballaciner was described  by the Nobel committee  as:

“Ballaciner” is a French neologism meaning adopting an attitude of a strolling moviegoer.

Themes

"Ballaciner" is mainly an essay about cinema. The essay makes note of the films that have affected the author and makes the connection between literature and cinema. According to a review, the author is "a self-declared cinephile, whose fascination for cinema has always gone hand in hand with his love of literature". Another reviewer noted that this essay "offers penetrating analyses of some of the 'disturbing, unforgettable dreams' conjured up on the cinema screen"

References

2003 essays
Essays by J. M. G. Le Clézio
Works by J. M. G. Le Clézio